Zygaenodini is a tribe of fungus weevils in the family Anthribidae. There are at least 3 genera and 20 described species in Zygaenodini.

Genera
These three genera belong to the tribe Zygaenodini:
 Araeoderes Schaeffer, 1906
 Eusphyrus LeConte, 1876
 Ormiscus G. R. Waterhouse, 1845

References

Further reading

 
 
 
 
 
 
 
 
 
 
 
 
 

Anthribidae
Articles created by Qbugbot